Night Out is the 1979 debut studio album by Ellen Foley, a long-time backup vocalist for Meat Loaf. Seven of the nine tracks were cover versions of Foley's favorite songs, while two were co-written by Foley, one of which was "We Belong to the Night", which hit #1 in the Netherlands and #31 in Australia around Christmas of 1979. The musicians were mostly from Ian Hunter's touring band for his 1979 album You're Never Alone with a Schizophrenic, with the addition of Australian musician Kerryn Tolhurst on slide guitar.

Hunter and ex-Spiders From Mars guitarist Mick Ronson produced the album. Ronson suggested the two Philip Rambow songs and the piano backing for the final track "Don't Let Go", written by Hunter.

Track listing

Charts

Weekly charts

Year-end charts

Certifications

Personnel
Ellen Foley - vocals
Mick Ronson - guitar, keyboards, percussion, string arrangements, background vocals
Ian Hunter - keyboards, guitar, percussion
Martin Briley - bass
Tom Mandel - keyboards
Kerryn Tolhurst - slide guitar
Hilly Michaels - drums
Rory Dodd - harmony vocals
Technical
Bob Clearmountain, Harvey Goldberg - engineers
Benno Friedman - photography

References

1979 debut albums
Ellen Foley albums
Albums produced by Mick Ronson
Epic Records albums